South Korea has concluded free trade agreements (FTAs) and other agreements with a trade component with countries around the world and is negotiating with others.

Trade agreements in force

Trade agreements signed yet in force

Trade agreements under negotiation

Trade agreements of interest

References 

Free trade agreements of South Korea
Economy of South Korea
Treaties of South Korea